The 2010 Newfoundland and Labrador Scotties Tournament of Hearts was held January 6-10 at the ReMax Centre in St. John's, Newfoundland and Labrador. The winning team, led by Shelley Nichols, represented Newfoundland and Labrador at the 2010 Scotties Tournament of Hearts in Sault Ste. Marie, Ontario.

Teams

Standings

Results

Draw 1
January 6, 1:30 PM

Draw 2
January 6, 7:30 PM

Draw 3
January 7, 9:30 AM

Draw 4
January 7, 3:30 PM

Draw 5
January 8, 9:30 AM

Playoffs

Semifinal
January 8, 7:30 PM

Final
January 9, 1:00 PM

Final 2 
January 9, 7:30 PM

** Nichols must be beaten twice

References

External links
Official site

Newfoundland and Labrador
Newfoundland and Labrador Scotties Tournament of Hearts
Sport in St. John's, Newfoundland and Labrador